Prison Stories: Women on the Inside is a 1991 American drama film directed by Donna Deitch, Joan Micklin Silver and Penelope Spheeris and written by Dick Beebe, Martin Jones, Marlane Meyer and Jule Selbo. The film stars Rae Dawn Chong, Lolita Davidovich, Annabella Sciorra, Talisa Soto and Rachel Ticotin. The film premiered on HBO on January 26, 1991.

Plot

Cast 
Rae Dawn Chong as Rhonda
Lolita Davidovich as Loretta Wright
Annabella Sciorra as Nicole
Talisa Soto as Rosina
Rachel Ticotin as Iris
Leontine Guilliard as Colleen
Debi Parker as Dee
Sharon Schaffer as Ibi
Sandy Martin as Counselor Pennell 
Robert Wallach as Guard Rae
Terri Hanauer as Wanda
Edwin Maldonado Jr. as Mico
Raymond Cruz as Montoya
Lorraine Morin-Torre as Carmen 
Jennifer Rhodes as Warden Blakely
Kevin Duffis as Guard Hollins
Myra Turley as Guard Paula
Edith Fields as Rose
Virginia Keehne as Molly
Elisabeth Moss as Little Molly
Daniel Riordan as Husband
Joel Swetow as Counselor D'Amico
Gillian Bagwell as Janice 
Marlon Taylor as Lemarr
John Freeland as Guard Huxtable
Mae E. Campbell as Guard Johnson 
Lois DeBanzie as Mrs. Benzinger
Paul Collins as Mr. Olney 
Al White as Mr. Chesler
Moe Bertran as Rodriguez 
Ken Butler as Correction Officer Heath
Silvana Gallardo as Mercedes
Francesca P. Roberts as Lucy
Kimberly Scott as Stacy
Grace Zabriskie as	Genevieve

References

External links
 

1991 television films
1991 films
1991 drama films
HBO Films films
Films directed by Joan Micklin Silver
Films directed by Penelope Spheeris
Films scored by Stanley Clarke
Films scored by J. Peter Robinson
American drama television films
1990s English-language films
1990s American films